The Regionalliga Nordost is the fourth tier of German football in the states of Berlin, Brandenburg, Mecklenburg-Western Pomerania, Saxony-Anhalt, Saxony and Thuringia. These comprise the states of former East Germany as well as West Berlin. 

It is one of five leagues at the fourth tier, together with the Regionalliga Bayern, Regionalliga Südwest, Regionalliga Nord and the Regionalliga West. From 1994 to 2000 it was part of the third tier, until the first of many re-structurings of the league system. The last of these occurred in 2012, which saw the Regionalliga Nordost reinstated.

Overview 
The Regionalliga Nordost was formed in 1994 to form a regional third level of play between the 2nd Bundesliga and the NOFV-Oberligas Nord, Mitte and Süd. The league was made up of 18 clubs, with two coming from the 2nd Bundesliga and six each from Mitte and Nord while the south only sent four. It was formed alongside three other Regionalligas, the Regionalliga Nord, West/Südwest and Süd. With the introduction of the Regionalliga also went the disbanding of the central division of the NOFV-Oberligas. Its clubs were spread between the remaining two.

The founding members of the Regionalliga Nordost were:

From the 2. Bundesliga:

Carl Zeiss Jena (Süd)
Tennis Borussia Berlin (Mitte)

From the NOFV-Oberliga Nord:

BSV Brandenburg
Eisenhüttenstädter FC Stahl
Reinickendorfer Füchse
FC Berlin
Spandauer SV
FSV Optik Rathenow

From the NOFV-Oberliga Mitte:

1. FC Union Berlin
Energie Cottbus
Türkiyemspor Berlin
Lok Altmark Stendal
Hertha BSC Berlin II
Hertha Zehlendorf

From the NOFV-Oberliga Süd:

Rot-Weiß Erfurt
Erzgebirge Aue
Sachsen Leipzig
Bischofswerdaer FV 08

The league contained 18 teams throughout its original six years.

The league winner was not always promoted to the 2nd Bundesliga. The champions of the Regionalligas Nord and Nordost had to play-off for a spot in the 2nd Bundesliga from 1996 to 2000. The winner of this contest was promoted, the loser faced the runners-ups of the Regionalligas Süd and West/Südwest for another spot in the second division.

In 1997, Energie Cottbus became the first club from the Regionalliga to reach a German Cup final, losing 2-0 to VfB Stuttgart.

The league was disbanded after six seasons. In 2000, the number of Regionalligas was reduced from four to two.  Most clubs from the league went to the Regionalliga Nord, some clubs from the south went to the Regionalliga Süd.

With the changes in the German league system in 2008, the number of Regionalligas was extended to three, with the formation of the Regionalliga West, a league which essentially is a reformation of the Regionalliga West/Südwest. The Regionalliga Nordost was not recreated, however. Instead, its clubs remained in the Regionalliga Nord.  Teams from its region playing in the Regionalliga Süd moved to the northern group as well, unless they qualified for the 2nd Bundesliga or 3rd Liga.

Disbanding 
When the league was discontinued in 2000, the top seven clubs in the league went to the two remaining Regionalligas, five to the north and two to the south, these being the two clubs from the state of Thuringia. The other eleven league teams were relegated to the NOFV-Oberligas.

To the Regionalliga Nord:

1. FC Union Berlin
Dresdner SC
Erzgebirge Aue
SV Babelsberg 03
Sachsen Leipzig

To the Regionalliga Süd:

Carl Zeiss Jena
Rot-Weiß Erfurt

Reestablishment 
In October 2010, another reform of the Regionalligas was agreed. The number of leagues was again expanded to five. The defunct Regionalliga Nordost was reestablished and a Regionalliga Bayern was established. Also, the Regionalliga West lost the clubs from the south west to a new league, formed out of those clubs and clubs from Regionalliga Süd outside Bavaria. The new system came into operation at the beginning of the 2012–13 season. The number of reserve teams per Regionalliga was limited to seven.

The five league champions, plus the runner-up of the Regionalliga Süd/Südwest, entered play-offs for the three promotion spots. The new leagues consisted of up to 22 clubs in their inaugural season, but were then reduced to between 16 and 18 clubs. The Regionalligas are not administrated by the DFB, but rather by the regional football associations. The reorganisation of the Regionalligas, so soon after the last changes in 2008, became necessary because of a large number of insolvencies. These were caused by a lack of media interest in the leagues, large expenses and infrastructure demands.

As four teams were relegated from the 3rd Liga starting at the end of the 2018–19 season, the champions of the Regionalliga Nordost (Chemnitzer FC), the Regionalliga Südwest and the Regionalliga West were promoted directly to the 3. Liga. The remaining two champions, from the Regionalliga Bayern and Nord, played a two-legged promotion play-off for the last promotion spot. In 2020, the three direct promotion spots will go to the champions of the Regionalliga Südwest, Regionalliga Bayern and Regionalliga Nord, and the champions of the Regionalliga Nordost and Regionalliga West will participate in the play-off. This format was installed initially as a temporary solution until the DFB-Bundestag was unsuccessful on a format that could have enabled all Regionalliga champions to be promoted. In September 2019, the Bundestag delegates voted to grant the Südwest and West champions two direct promotions indefinitely starting in 2021. A third direct promotion place will be assigned according to a rotation principle among the Regionalliga Nord, Nordost and Bavarian champions. The representatives from the two remaining Regionalligen will determine the fourth promoted club in two-legged playoffs.

Overview of football in the Nordost region

Winners and runners-up of the Regionalliga Nordost
The winners and runners-up of the league:

 Promoted teams in bold.

League statistics
The top goalscorers and spectator statistics for the league since it reformed in 2012:

Placings in the Regionalliga Nordost
The following clubs have played in the league and achieved the following final positions:

 1 Wacker Nordhausen withdrew for financial reasons at the end of the 2019–20 season.
 2 Rot-Weiß Erfurt declared insolvency during the 2019–20 season and was automatically relegated.
 3 RB Leipzig II was withdrawn from competition at the end of the 2016–17 season.
 4 FC Schönberg withdrew from the league also for financial reasons at the end of the 2016–17 season.
 5 1. FC Union Berlin II was also withdrawn from competition at the end of the 2014–15 season.
 6 VFC Plauen also declared insolvency during the 2014–15 season and was automatically relegated.

Key

References

Sources
 Deutschlands Fußball in Zahlen,  An annual publication with tables and results from the Bundesliga to Verbandsliga/Landesliga. DSFS.
 Kicker Almanach,  The yearbook on German football from Bundesliga to Oberliga, since 1937. Kicker Sports Magazine.
 Die Deutsche Liga-Chronik 1945-2005  History of German football from 1945 to 2005 in tables. DSFS. 2006.

External links 
 Das deutsche Fussball Archiv 
 Regionalligas at Fussballdaten.de

Nordost
Football competitions in Berlin
Football competitions in Brandenburg
Football competitions in Mecklenburg-Western Pomerania
Football competitions in Saxony
Football competitions in Saxony-Anhalt
1994 establishments in Germany
2000 disestablishments in Germany
2012 establishments in Germany
Sports leagues established in 1994
Sports leagues disestablished in 2000
Sports leagues established in 2012